Raúl Paz Alonzo (born 21 February 1976) is a Mexican politician affiliated with the National Regeneration Movement. As of 2013 he served as Deputy of the LXII Legislature of the Mexican Congress representing Yucatán.

References

1976 births
Living people
Politicians from Yucatán (state)
People from Mérida, Yucatán
Members of the Chamber of Deputies (Mexico) for Yucatán
National Action Party (Mexico) politicians
21st-century Mexican politicians
Monterrey Institute of Technology and Higher Education alumni
Senators of the LXIV and LXV Legislatures of Mexico
Deputies of the LXII Legislature of Mexico
Members of the Senate of the Republic (Mexico) for Yucatán